Daniele Bracciali and Lovro Zovko are the defending champions; however, they chose not to compete together.
Bracciali played with Julian Knowle and Zovko partnered with Dustin Brown.

James Cerretani and Philipp Marx won the title, defeating Bracciali and Knowle 6–3, 6–4 in the final.

Seeds

Draw

Draw

References
 Doubles Draw

San Marino CEPU Open - Doubles
San Marino CEPU Open